MICA, formerly Mudra Institute of Communications, Ahmedabad, is a business school and an autonomous, non-profit institute of higher education, located on the outskirts of the western Indian city of Ahmedabad.
Established in 1991, MICA is the only residential institute in India and perhaps in the Asia-Pacific region, dedicated to creating leadership in the area of Strategic Marketing and Communication. MICA has a wide range of academic offerings including residential programmes for Post Graduate Management Studies and a Fellow Programme in Management (Communication) (residential, but off campus).

History
MICA was established in 1991 by A. G. Krishnamurthy of Mudra Communications, as an autonomous post graduate academic institute. The main academic block was inaugurated in 1993 and MICA relocated to its current campus at Shela. It was also the year in which its first Director Binod C. Agrawal began his tenure. The first batch of PGPD program in Communications was inaugurated in 1994. Atul Tandon served as director from 2001 to 2009. Shailendra Raj Mehta is the current director and president.

Academics
MICA offers various post-graduate certificate programmes in the area of strategic communication and marketing either as fully residential programmes or as online programmes. It also offers a fellow (doctoral level) programme. MICA has partnered with Emory University for data analytics, luxury marketing and consumer insight and with Michigan State University (MSU) and Northwestern University for marketing management and integrated marketing communications. MICA has three residential programmes - Post Graduate Diploma in Management (Communications) and Crafting Creative Communication. PGDM-C is the flagship programme offered by MICA.MICA also offers a doctoral program called Fellow Program in Management (FPM) ( communication). 

From the year 2019, MICA has also launched a new postgraduate program called the Post Graduate Diploma in Management.

Notable faculty

 Shailendra Raj Mehta, President and Director, MICA and Distinguished Professor for Innovation and Entrepreneurship at MICA.

References

External links
 MICA's Official Website

 

Marketing organizations
Marketing in India
Communications in Gujarat
MICA (institute)
Educational institutions established in 1991
1991 establishments in Gujarat